Reno H. Thomas (July 11, 1922 – August 17, 2009) was an American politician who was a Republican member of the Pennsylvania House of Representatives.

References

Republican Party members of the Pennsylvania House of Representatives
1922 births
2009 deaths
20th-century American politicians
People from Snyder County, Pennsylvania